Dogs of War! is a 1923 silent short subject, the fourteenth entry in Hal Roach's Our Gang (Little Rascals) series. Directed by Robert F. McGowan, the two-reel short was released to theaters in July 1923 by Pathé Exchange. The short was filmed alongside Why Worry?, a feature comedy produced by Roach and starring Harold Lloyd, who makes a cameo appearance in Dogs of War as himself.

Plot
Near West Coast Studios in Hollywood, the gang is waging a street war against a rival group of kids; their ammunition primarily consisting of old vegetables. The battle is halted when Mary is called to act in one of the West Coast films. The rest of the gang tries to crash the studio gates and get a role in the picture, but the casting director throws them out. Farina manages to sneak into the studio, however, prompting the other kids to sneak in after her. Several chases throughout the property then ensue and the gang eventually escapes - with a little help from Harold Lloyd.

Cast

The Gang
 Joe Cobb as Joe
 Jackie Condon as Jackie
 Mickey Daniels as Mickey
 Jack Davis as Jack
 Allen Hoskins as Farina
 Mary Kornman as Mary
 Ernest Morrison as Ernie "Sunshine Sammy"

Additional cast
 Andy Samuel as Rival gang member
 George "Freckles" Warde as Rival gang member
 Gabe Saienz as Rival gang member
 Elmo Billings as Rival gang member
 Harold Lloyd as himself
 Jobyna Ralston as herself
 Roy Brooks as Studio receptionist
 Sammy Brooks as Studio crew member
 Bob Davis as Truck driver
 Dick Gilbert as Studio guard
 William Gillespie as Studio director
 Clara Guiol as Studio actress
 Wallace Howe as Actor around the lot
 Walter Lundin as Harold Lloyd's cameraman
 Joseph Morrison as Studio assistant director
 Fred Newmeyer as Harold Lloyd's cameraman
 Charles Stevenson as Studio actor
 Leo White as Actor around the lot
 Charley Young as Studio cameraman

Notes
When the television rights for the original silent Pathé Our Gang comedies were sold to National Telepix and other distributors, several episodes were retitled. Footage from the first half of this film was released into television syndication as Mischief Makers in 1960 under the title Battleground.
Footage from the second half of this film was released to the series in the hybrid episode "Hollywood U.S.A.".
Later on MGM Our Gang used a similar rotten vegetable war theme in the 1941 short Fightin Fools

See also
 Our Gang filmography

References

External links

 
 
 

1923 films
Hal Roach Studios short films
American silent short films
American black-and-white films
Films directed by Robert F. McGowan
Our Gang films
1923 comedy films
1923 short films
1920s American films
Silent American comedy films
1920s English-language films